The 2018–19 Liga Nacional de Fútbol de Guatemala season was the 21st season of the Liga Nacional de Guatemala, the top football league in Guatemala, in which the Apertura and Clausura season is used. The season began in July 2018 and ended in May 2019.

Team information 

A total of 12 teams will contest the league, including 10 sides from the 2017–18 Liga Nacional and 2 promoted from the 2017–18 Primera División.

Deportivo Marquense and C.D. Suchitepéquez were relegated to 2018–19 Primera División the previous season.

The relegated team was replaced by the 2017–18 Primera División winners. Chiantla  and Deportivo Iztapa.

Promotion and relegation 

Promoted from Primera División de Ascenso as of June 2018.

 Champions: Chiantla  and Deportivo Iztapa

Relegated to Primera División de Ascenso as of June 2018.

 Last Place: Deportivo Marquense and C.D. Suchitepéquez

Personnel and sponsoring

Managerial changes

Beginning of the season

During the Apertura season

Between Apertura and Clausura seasons

During the Clausura season

Apertura

League table

Results

Playoffs

Final

First leg

Second leg

Clausura

League table

Results

Playoffs

Quarterfinals

First legs

Second legs

Guastatoya advances 2–1 on aggregate.

3–3 on aggregate. Malacateco advances 3–0 on away goals.

Semifinals

First legs

Second legs

Antigua GFC advances 2-1 on aggregate.

Malacateco advances 2–3 on aggregate.

Final
First leg

Second leg

Aggregate table

List of foreign players in the league
This is a list of foreign players in 2018-2019 season. The following players:
have played at least one apertura game for the respective club.
have not been capped for the Guatemala national football team on any level, independently from the birthplace.  

A new rule was introduced a few season ago, that clubs can only have five foreign players per club and can only add a new player if there is an injury or player/s is released.

 (player released during the Apertura season) (player released between the Apertura and Clausura seasons) (player released during the Clausura season)''

External links
 https://lared.com.gt/deportes/futbol/liga-nacional/
 https://www.guatevision.com/etiqueta/futbol-guatemala/

Liga Nacional de Fútbol de Guatemala seasons
1
Guatemala